The San Francisco Writers Grotto (sometimes referred to as "The Grotto") is a writers' coworking space in San Francisco’s SOMA district. Founded in 1993 by writers Po Bronson, Ethan Canin and Ethan Watters, the Writers Grotto is a community of working writers which provides support, feedback, and community to its members. Members have won Pulitzer prizes and Guggenheim Fellowships and penned New York Times bestsellers, national TV series and movies. Notable alumni include ZZ Packer, Roberto Lovato, Mary Roach, and Julia Scheeres. All Writers Grotto members are vetted before acceptance and must have a published book or a significant amount of journalistic or related media work published.

Notable Members 

 Julia Scheeres, author of A Thousand Lives: The Untold Story of Jonestown
 Zara Stone, author of Killer Looks: The Forgotten History of Plastic Surgery In Prisons
 Brad Balukjian, author of The Waxpack
 Rachel Levin, author of  Eat Something: A Wise Sons Book for Jews Who Like Food and Food Lovers Who Like Jews
 Bonnie Tsui, author of Why We Swim
 Vanessa Hua, author of A River Of Stars
 Caroline Paul, author of You Are Mighty, A Guide to Changing the World
 Joshua Mohr, author of Fight Song
 Vendela Vida, author of The Diver's Clothes Lie Empty
 Noah Hawley, creator of TV shows Fargo and Legion.

External links 

 San Francisco Writers Grotto

References 

Writing circles
Organizations based in San Francisco
Culture of San Francisco
San Francisco Bay Area literature